David Singh may refer to:

David Singh (fictional character), a fictional character in DC Comics
David Arthur Singh (1929–1978), Guyanese diplomat and politician
David Joseph Singh (born 1958), American theoretical physicist